Stonehouse Farm is a historic home located at Oneonta in Otsego County, New York. It was built in 1820 in the Federal style.  It is a -story cross-gable stone house, with -story flanking wings set back from the front elevation.  It features a wooden portico supported by two clusters of three Doric order columns built about 1950.

It was listed on the National Register of Historic Places in 1980.

References

Houses on the National Register of Historic Places in New York (state)
Federal architecture in New York (state)
Houses completed in 1820
Houses in Otsego County, New York
National Register of Historic Places in Otsego County, New York